In hoofed animals, the deciduous hoof capsule is the eponychium in fetuses and newborn foals. It is a deciduous structure, which disappears as the animal grows. In equines, they are shed soon after a foal begins to stand. The shedding process can vary from dropping-off whole to the gradual wearing down of the capsule. Common names used in lay literature include "golden slippers", "fairy fingers", and "horse feathers".

References

Works cited 

 
 

Mammal anatomy
Ungulates
Equine hoof